Tellus Series B: Chemical and Physical Meteorology is a scientific journal that was published by Blackwell Publishing for the International Meteorological Institute in Stockholm, Sweden until December 2011. From January 2012 the issues are published online by Co-action Publishing as an open access journal. The journal publishes original articles, short contributions, and correspondence on atmospheric chemistry, surface exchange processes, long-range and global transport, aerosol science, and cloud physics including related radiation transfer. Biogeochemical cycles including related aspects of marine chemistry and geochemistry also represent a central theme.

Tellus B is the companion to Tellus Series A: Dynamic Meteorology and Oceanography.

See also 
 List of scientific journals
 List of scientific journals in earth and atmospheric sciences

References

External links 
 Journal homepage at Blackwell Publishing
 Journal homepage at Co-action Publishing

Geochemistry journals
Meteorology journals
Wiley-Blackwell academic journals
English-language journals
Publications established in 1948